Trayvon Henderson (born August 15, 1995) is an American football safety for the Cincinnati Bengals of the National Football League (NFL). He played college football at Hawaii.

Professional career
Henderson signed with the Cincinnati Bengals as an undrafted free agent on May 11, 2018. He was placed on injured reserve on September 1, 2018.

On August 31, 2019, Henderson was waived by the Bengals and was signed to the practice squad the next day. He was promoted to the active roster on December 7, 2019.

On September 5, 2020, Henderson was waived by the Bengals and signed to the practice squad the next day. He was elevated to the active roster for the team's week 1 game against the Los Angeles Chargers and reverted to the practice squad following the game. He was elevated again to the team's active roster on September 17 for the team's week 2 game against the Cleveland Browns and reverted to the practice squad the next day. He was placed on the practice squad/COVID-19 list by the team on November 18, 2020, and restored to the practice squad three days later. He was signed to the active roster on December 12, 2020. On December 26, 2020, Henderson was waived. On December 29, 2020, Henderson re-signed to Cincinnati's practice squad. 

Henderson signed a reserve/future contract on January 4, 2021. He was waived on August 31, 2021, but signed with the practice squad the next day.

On February 15, 2022, Henderson signed a reserve/future contract.

References

External links
Cincinnati Bengals bio
Hawaii Rainbow Warriors bio

1995 births
Living people
American football safeties
Hawaii Rainbow Warriors football players
Players of American football from Sacramento, California
Cincinnati Bengals players